Salwan Jassim Abbood (born 26 September 1991) is an Iraqi male weightlifter, competing in the 105 kg category and representing Iraq at international competitions. He placed ninth in the men's 105 kg event at the 2016 Summer Olympics.

Major results

References

1991 births
Living people
Iraqi male weightlifters
People from Baghdad
Weightlifters at the 2014 Asian Games
Olympic weightlifters of Iraq
Weightlifters at the 2016 Summer Olympics
Weightlifters at the 2018 Asian Games
Asian Games silver medalists for Iraq
Asian Games medalists in weightlifting
Medalists at the 2018 Asian Games
Islamic Solidarity Games medalists in weightlifting
20th-century Iraqi people
21st-century Iraqi people